Villa Pancho is a census-designated place (CDP) in Cameron County, Texas, United States. The population was 788 at the 2010 census, up from 386 at the 2000 census. It is part of the Brownsville–Harlingen Metropolitan Statistical Area.

Geography

Demographics
At the 2000 census, there were 386 people, 96 households and 86 families residing in the CDP. The population density was 1,277.3 per square mile (496.8/km2). There were 107 housing units at an average density of 354.1/sq mi (137.7/km2). The racial makeup of the CDP was 97.93% White, 0.26% Pacific Islander, 1.81% from other races. Hispanic or Latino of any race were 95.08% of the population.

There were 96 households, of which 67.7% had children under the age of 18 living with them, 60.4% were married couples living together, 20.8% had a female householder with no husband present, and 9.4% were non-families. 7.3% of all households were made up of individuals, and 2.1% had someone living alone who was 65 years of age or older. The average household size was 4.02 and the average family size was 4.18.

Age distribution was 42.5% under the age of 18, 12.7% from 18 to 24, 27.2% from 25 to 44, 13.0% from 45 to 64, and 4.7% who were 65 years of age or older. The median age was 23 years. For every 100 females, there were 90.1 males. For every 100 females age 18 and over, there were 85.0 males.

The median household income was $12,500, and the median family income was $13,472. Males had a median income of $14,625 versus $11,786 for females. The per capita income for the CDP was $5,685. About 55.7% of families and 46.7% of the population were below the poverty line, including 51.3% of those under age 18 and 58.5% of those age 65 or over.

Education
Villa Pancho is served by the Brownsville Independent School District.

In addition, South Texas Independent School District operates magnet schools that serve the community.

References

Census-designated places in Cameron County, Texas
Census-designated places in Texas